This is a list of monarchs who lost their thrones in the 14th century.

Achaea
Philip I of Taranto, Prince of Achaea. Ceded Achaea to Matilda of Hainaut in 1313. Died 1331.
Matilda of Hainaut, Princess of Achaea. Deposed by John, Duke of Durazzo in 1318. Died 1331.
John, Duke of Durazzo, Prince of Achaea. Ceded Achaea to Robert of Taranto in 1332.
Philip II of Taranto, Prince of Achaea. Deposed 1373. Died 1374.
Joan I of Naples, Princess of Achaea. Deposed 1381. Died 1382.

Albania
Robert of Taranto, King of Albania 1332, title passed over to John of Gravina as the "Duke of Durazzo".

Austria

Leopold III, Duke of Austria, Duke of Austria between 1365-1379, lost Austria to Albert III.

Bosnia

Tvrtko I of Bosnia, Ban of Bosnia, deposed 1366, reinstated 1367.

Bulgaria

Chaka, Emperor of Bulgaria 1299 to 1300, deposed and strangled in prison 1300.
Ivan Stephen, Emperor of Bulgaria 1330 to 1331, deposed, died in exile after 1343.

Byzantine Empire

Andronicus II Palaeologus, abdicated 1328.
John V Palaeologus, deposed 1347, restored 1355, redeposed 1376, restored 1379, redeposed once more 1390, restored later that year.
John VI Cantacuzenus, deposed 1354.
Andronicus IV Palaeologus, deposed 1379.
John VII Palaeologus, deposed 1390.

Cambodia

Brhat Pada Samdach Sdach Rajankariya Brhat Sidhanta Rajadhiraja Ramadipati, King of Cambodia, abdicated 1346.

Castile
Pedro of Castile, King of Castile, deposed 1366, restored 1367.
Henry of Trastamara, King of Castile, deposed 1367, restored 1369.

Carinthia
Albert III, Duke of Austria, Duke of Carinthia (with Leopold III), lost Carinthia to Leopold in 1379.

Cephalonia
John II Orsini, Count of Cephalonia 1323-1324, deposed by John of Gravina.

Chagatai Khanate

Eljigidey, deposed 1329.
Kebek, deposed 1310, restored 1318.

Clermont-en-Beauvaisis

Louis I, Duke of Bourbon, exchanged the County of Clermont-en-Beauvaisis for that of La Marche in 1327.

Denmark

Christopher II of Denmark, deposed 1326; returned 1329.
Valdemar III of Denmark, deposed 1329.

Egypt

an-Nasir Nasir-ad-Din Muhammad, Mameluke sultan of Egypt 1293-1295, 1299-1309 and 1309-1340.
an-Nasir Nasir-ad-Din al-Hasan, Mameluke sultan of Egypt 1347-1351 and 1354-1361
as-Salih Salah-ad-Din Hajji I, Mameluke sultan of Egypt 1382 and 1389.
Barquq, Mameluke sultan of Egypt 1382–1389 and 1390–1399, died 1399.

England
Edward II, King of England, abdicated 1327.
Richard II, King of England, deposed 1399.

Epirus

Nikephoros II Orsini Despot of Epirus 1335-1338 and 1356-1359, died 1359.

Hungary

Mary of Hungary "Queen-Regnant" of Hungary 1382–1385 and 1386–1395, died 1395.

Ilkhanate

Musa (Ilkhanid dynasty) Ilkhan 1336, deposed and fled.

Imereti

Bagrat I of Imereti, King of Imereti, deposed 1330.

Japan

Emperors

Emperor Go-Fushimi Emperor of Japan 1298-1301, abdicated 1301, died 1336 .
Emperor Hanazono Emperor of Japan 1308-1318, abdicated 1314, died 1348 .

South Court

Emperor Chōkei South Emperor of Japan 1368-1383, died 1394.
Emperor Go-Kameyama South Emperor of Japan 1383-1392, died 1424 .

North Court

Emperor Kōgon North Emperor of Japan 1331-1333, deposed 1333, died 1364 .
Emperor Kōmyō North Emperor of Japan 1336-1348, abdicated 1348, died 1380 .
Emperor Sukō North Emperor of Japan 1348-1351, abdicated 1351, died 1398 .
Emperor Go-Kōgon North Emperor of Japan 1352-1371, died 1374.
Emperor Go-En'yū North Emperor of Japan 1371-1382, died 1393 .

Majorca
 James III of Majorca, King of Majorca, deposed 1344, died 1349.

Moldavia

Bâlc of Moldavia Voivode of Moldavia 1359, deposed, died 1395.

Naples

Joanna I, Queen of Naples, deposed 1382.
Ladislaus, King of Naples, deposed 1389, restored 1399.
Louis II, King of Naples, deposed 1399.

Poznań

Wladislaw IV the Short Prince of Poznań 1296-1300 and 1314-1333, died 1333 
Václav II. Prince of Poznań 1300-1302, died 1305
Przemyslaw II of Glogów, Prince of Poznań 1309-1312, died 1331.
Henry IV the True (of Zagan), Prince of Poznań 1309-1312, died 1342
John of Scinawa Prince of Poznań 1309-1312, died 1361/5
Bolesław of Oleśnica Prince of Poznań 1309-1312, died 1322
Conrad of Namyslów Prince of Poznań 1309-1312, died 1366

Ponthieu

James I, Count of La Marche Count of Ponthieu from 1351 to 1360, died 1362 .

Saluzzo
Manfred V of Saluzzo, marquess of Saluzzo, forced to cede the throne in 1334, usurped throne in 1341, deposed and imprisoned, 1342.

Serbia
Stephen Uroš III Dečanski, King of Serbia 1321-1331, overthrown and murdered 1331.

Styria

Albert III, Duke of Austria, Duke of Styria (with Leopold) 1365-1379, lost Styria to Leopold III.

Tibet
Drakpa Changchub of Phagmo Dru, deposed or abdicated 1381, died 1386. 
Sonam Drakpa of Phagmo Dru, deposed or abdicated 1385, died 1408.

Tyrol
Albert III, Duke of Austria, Count of Tyrol (with Leopold III) 1365-1379, lost Tyrol to Leopold.

Turkey

Sultan Murad I was killed in battle in 1389.

White Horde

Tokhtamysh Khan of the White Horde 1378–1380, title integrated into the Golden Horde.

Zahumlje

Nikola Altomanović, ruler of Zahumlje, deposed and blinded, 1873.

Zurichgau

John II of Zurichgau, ruler of Zurichgau 1337-1351, died 1380

See also
List of monarchs who abdicated
List of monarchs who lost their thrones in the 19th century
List of monarchs who lost their thrones in the 18th century
List of monarchs who lost their thrones in the 17th century
List of monarchs who lost their thrones in the 16th century
List of monarchs who lost their thrones in the 15th century
List of monarchs who lost their thrones in the 13th century
List of monarchs who lost their thrones before the 13th century

14
 
Lists of 14th-century people